Antonia Gentry (born September 25, 1997) is an American actress. She is best known for her role as Virginia "Ginny" Miller in the Netflix series Ginny & Georgia (2021–present).

Early life and education 
Antonia Gentry was born in Atlanta, Georgia. She is biracial. Her mother is black and from Jamaica, and her father is white. Since she was five years old, she wanted to be an actress. Her first involvement in theater was acting in plays that her mother wrote at their community theater.

She studied drama at the John S. Davidson Fine Arts Magnet School in Augusta, Georgia. She also attended Emory University for drama. At Emory, she was a member of the university's comedy-improv troupe, Rathskellar Comedy Improv Group. Before her graduation in 2019, she balanced acting roles with being a full-time college student in addition to having a part-time job.

Career 
Gentry has acted in a variety of smaller roles, including two shorts in 2015. In 2018, she played Jasmine in the romantic comedy feature film Candy Jar and acted in one episode of superhero television series, Raising Dion.

She graduated from Emory in the same week that she got an audition for Ginny & Georgia. She won the role and, in 2021, the series was released on Netflix.

Personal life 
Gentry lives in New York City.

Filmography

Awards and nominations

References

External links 
 

Living people
1997 births
21st-century American actresses
Actresses from Atlanta
American actors of Jamaican descent
Emory University alumni
African-American actresses
20th-century African-American people
21st-century African-American people
20th-century African-American women
21st-century African-American women